ROTJ may refer to:

 Return of the Jedi, a 1983 Star Wars film
 Return of the Jedi (disambiguation)
 Return of the Joker (disambiguation)